The Decebalus Treasure is written by Cassius Dio concerning events said to have happened in the Roman world during the 2nd century AD.

The story
During the Second Dacian War many Dacian nobles surrendered or were caught. One of them, Bicilis, disclosed the location of the treasure, buried in a river's bed. 

"The treasures of Decebalus were also discovered, though hidden beneath the river Sargetia, which ran past his palace. With the help of some captives Decebalus had diverted the course of the river, made an excavation in its bed, and into the cavity had thrown a large amount of silver and gold and other objects of great value that could stand a certain amount of moisture; then he had heaped stones over them and piled on earth, afterwards bringing the river back into his course. He also had caused the same captives to deposit his robes and other articles of a like nature in caves, and after accomplishing this had made away with them to prevent them from disclosing anything. But Bicilis, a companion of his who knew what had been done, was seized and gave information about these things."

Decebalus used Roman prisoners to deviate the course of the Sargetia river and buried the treasure. He buried "so much silver and gold and some other artefacts who can survive moisture", after that the river was returned to its original course. The rest was of the treasure was deposited in surrounding caves, and the Roman prisoners were slaughtered.

Sources

T. Statilius Crito of Heraclea,  Trajan's procurator and medic, compiling a Getica, wrote that the Decebalus Treasure had 5,000,000 lbs (2,200 tonnes) of gold and 10,000,000 lbs (4,500 tonnes) of silver. Some modern historians, such as Julian Bennett believe that this is a copy error. Still if the real treasure was one ten-thousandth of those figures, its value is still the equivalent of 160 million denarii and 31.5 million aurei.

Jérôme Carcopino has estimated the treasure at 165,500 kg of gold and 331,000 kg of silver. Between 1540 and 1759 in Sarmizegetusa Regia 700 kg of gold was recovered, much more was discovered in the 19th century.

However, the Roman's claim that they looted in a single hoard 165 tons of gold and 300 tons of silver is accepted by some historians. This amount is perhaps credible in terms of the massive Dacian exploitation of precious metals in the Apuseni Mountains along with trade payments and tributes from abroad (including from Roman empire) paid to Dacia. Also, its existence in one spot suggests that Dacian State had a central control of precious metal circulation.

A similar legend to the concealment of Decebalus' treasure concerns the treasure of Alaric I king of the Visigoths (died in 410 AD).

See also
 Decebalus
 Trajan's Dacian Wars
 Trajan

References

Bibliography

 

Military history of Dacia
Thracian archaeological artifacts